The Chinese Ambassador to Vanuatu is the official representative of the People's Republic of China to the Republic of Vanuatu.

List of representatives

See also
China–Vanuatu relations

References 

 
Vanuatu
China